Carlos Alfonso Espósito (born November 4, 1941) is a retired Argentine football referee. He is known for having refereed two matches in the 1986 FIFA World Cup in Mexico.

References
Profile

1941 births
Argentine football referees
FIFA World Cup referees
Living people
1986 FIFA World Cup referees
Place of birth missing (living people)
20th-century Argentine people